Gephyromantis malagasius, commonly known as the Malasay grainy frog, is a species of frog in the family Mantellidae.  It is endemic to Madagascar.  Its natural habitats are subtropical or tropical moist lowland forests and subtropical or tropical moist montane forests.  It is threatened by habitat loss.

References

malagasius
Endemic fauna of Madagascar
Taxa named by Paul Ayshford Methuen
Taxa named by John Hewitt (herpetologist)
Amphibians described in 1913
Taxonomy articles created by Polbot